Verto Studio 3D is a computer graphics program for 3D modelling, targeted at mobile content generation for touch devices. It is written using the Cocoa Touch API for iOS and using Cocoa for macOS. The product was initially released in 2011 for the iPad shortly after the device was released.

3D graphics software
2011 software